A cosmorama is an exhibition of perspective pictures of different places in the world, usually world landmarks. Careful use of illumination and lenses gives the images greater realism.

Cosmorama was also the name of an entertainment in 19th century London, at 207-209 Regent Street, at which the public could view scenes of distant lands and exotic subjects through optical devices that magnified the pictures. It was later converted into an exhibition of curiosities named the Prince of Wales Bazaar. Exhibits included a sea lion, a sea serpent and L. Bertolotto's Flea circus.

Port-au-Prince Cosmorama

Port-au-Prince Cosmorama was an exhibition of perspective pictures of different places and landmarks in the world, held on March 2, 1834, in Port-au-Prince, Haiti.

Cosmoramic Views Exhibited

 View of Paris, with Place Vendôme and the beautiful high column by Napoéon.
 View the Père Lachaise cemetery in Paris, presenting the graves of Molière, Lafontaine Delisle, Grétri etc.
 View of the beautiful and pistoresque fall of Tequendama in Colombia, near Santa Fe de Bogota.
 Perspective view of Madrid and the palace King of Spain.
 Interior view of London with a view of the Thames from Black Friars Bridge, the prospect of the beautiful church of St. Paul.
 View of the Battle of New Orleans, between the Americans and the English. (January 8, 1815)

See also
Cyclorama
Diorama
Eidophusikon
Myriorama
Panorama
Panoramic painting

External links
 
 
 The Cosmorama 
 Port-au-Prince Cosmorama 

Entertainment
Optical toys
Landscape art by type